René Arce Islas (born 22 October 1953) is a Mexican politician affiliated with the PVEM. He served as Deputy of the LIX Legislature of the Mexican Congress representing the Federal District and as Senator during the LX and LXI Legislatures, then with the PRD.

In 2011 he disaffiliated of the PRD.

References

1953 births
Living people
People from Oaxaca City
Members of the Senate of the Republic (Mexico)
Members of the Chamber of Deputies (Mexico)
Party of the Democratic Revolution politicians
Ecologist Green Party of Mexico politicians
21st-century Mexican politicians
Politicians from Oaxaca
National Autonomous University of Mexico alumni
Academic staff of the Autonomous University of Guerrero
20th-century Mexican politicians
Members of the Congress of Mexico City